Strâmtura (or Strimtere) is a commune in Maramureș County, Maramureș, Romania. It is composed of three villages: Glod (Glód), Slătioara (Izasópatak) and Strâmtura.

Natives
Mihai Pop

References

Communes in Maramureș County
Localities in Romanian Maramureș